Nabob is an unincorporated community located in the town of West Bend, Washington County, Wisconsin, United States. It was the site of St. Mathias Catholic Church (the graveyard of which is still extant), and is sometimes called St. Mathias for that reason. There was still a Nabob post office in 1901.

References

Unincorporated communities in Washington County, Wisconsin
Unincorporated communities in Wisconsin